John Houghton may refer to:

Politicians
 John Houghton (fl.1393), MP for Leicester (UK Parliament constituency)
 John Houghton (died 1583) (before 1522–1583), MP for Stamford (UK Parliament constituency)
 John Houghton (Manx politician)
 John Houghton (Zimbabwean politician)

Others
 John Houghton (physicist) (1931–2020), Welsh atmospheric physicist
 John Houghton (martyr) (c. 1486–1535), English Catholic priest and martyr
 John Houghton (apothecary) (1645–1705), English writer, apothecary and merchant
 John Houghton (footballer), New Zealand international footballer
 John Houghton (footballer born 1891), former player of Fulham and Wigan
 John Houghton (rugby league) (fl. 1970), former St Helens RLFC rugby player